Pipestem Creek is a stream in the U.S. state of West Virginia.

Pipestem Creek was named for the fact early settlers fashioned pipe stems from a plant which grew along the creek's banks.

See also
List of rivers of West Virginia

References

Rivers of Summers County, West Virginia
Rivers of West Virginia